The deputy prime minister of Antigua and Barbuda is the deputy head of government of that country.

The current deputy prime minister is Robin Yearwood, who has had that office since 18 June 2014.

Deputy Premier

Deputy Prime Minister

References 

1971 establishments in Antigua and Barbuda
Prime ministers
Antigua
Politics of Antigua and Barbuda